Wendell Craig Williams is a former federal prosecutor, Assistant United States Attorney, member of the United States Marine Corps, and member of the Pennsylvania House of Representatives for the 160th district. He received his bachelor's degree from Duke University in 1987, his J.D. degree from the University of Florida Levin College of Law in 1997 and his master's degree from Columbia University in 2001.

Craig served as Second Lieutenant during The Persian Gulf War. He was later promoted to Colonel in the United States Marine Corps.

Currently, in addition to his work as a prosecutor, he devotes many hours to support the youth of America as the Scoutmaster of a local Scout troop and advisor and founder of a Venturing Crew.

Personal life
Craig Williams lives in Glen Mills, Pennsylvania with his wife, Jennifer Arbittier Williams, an Assistant United States Attorney, and their four children, Emma, Clayton, Cole, and Charlotte.

Career

Marines
In 1987, he was commissioned as a 2nd lieutenant. During the 1991 Persian Gulf War, he flew 56 combat missions in the F/A-18D "Hornet." In 1996, he became a Marine Judge Advocate and joined the Reserves. In 2005, he was mobilized to active duty to serve as Deputy Legal Counsel to the Chairman of the Joint Chiefs of Staff. He was later selected for promotion to the rank of colonel in the Marine Corps.

Legal work

Williams worked as a federal prosecutor, and served on the Joint Terrorism Task Force. During active duty, he served as deputy legal counsel to the chairman of the Joint Chiefs of Staff. Williams clerked with the Honorable J.L. Edmondson, the Chief Judge of the United States Court of Appeals for the Eleventh Circuit. He has served as an assistant U.S. Attorney in Colorado and Pennsylvania, and worked under former Chairman of the Joint Chiefs of Staff General Richard B. Myers and General Peter Pace.

2008 congressional campaign

He was endorsed by several high-profile organizations, including The Philadelphia Inquirer. He also received endorsements from, among others, Vice Presidential nominee Sarah Palin, Pennsylvania Senator Arlen Specter, former Pennsylvania Governor Tom Ridge and former New York City Mayor Rudy Giuliani, all of whom also campaigned for Williams. His campaign was ultimately unsuccessful, losing to the incumbent Joe Sestak.

2020 House of Representatives campaign 

Craig is also currently in the race for Pennsylvania state representative in the 160 legislative district. He and his daughter (Charlotte) have knocked on 11,000 doors. His son (Cole) is the Deputy Director of Art and Photography; he has been capturing moments all throughout election day. His wife (Jennifer) has been doing just as much, and if not, more, work than anyone else. Emma and Clayton who are going to college at Vanderbilt and Duke, were knocking, planning and calling along with Craig the entire time.

Committee assignments 

 Aging & Older Adult Services
 Human Services
 Urban Affairs
 Veterans Affairs & Emergency Preparedness

Electoral history
 2008 Race for Congress
 Joe Sestak (D) (inc.), 59.6%
 Wendell Craig Williams (R), 40.4%

See also

Craig Williams Voting Record

References

1965 births
Living people
People from Selma, Alabama
Duke University alumni
Columbia University alumni
University of Florida alumni
United States Marine Corps officers
United States Marine Corps personnel of the Iraq War
American prosecutors
People from Delaware County, Pennsylvania
Republican Party members of the Pennsylvania House of Representatives
21st-century American politicians